Saul was a king of Edom mentioned in the Bible, in Genesis 36:31-43. He succeeded Samlah of Masrekah in the apparently elective kingship of the early Edomites. He is described as being from "Rehoboth on the River". He was succeeded by Baal-hanan ben Achbor. 

The dates and other details of his reign are unknown, as he is not mentioned in any other surviving source.

Kings of Edom
Book of Genesis people